Landon Pembelton (born February 2, 2005) is an American professional stock car racing driver. He competes part-time in the ARCA Menards Series, driving the No. 15 Toyota Camry for Venturini Motorsports.

Racing career

Early career
Pembelton debuted in organized racing in 2019, running eight races at South Boston Speedway, collecting six top-fives. The following year, Pembelton won the Virginia Racers Challenge Series, which was run at Dominion Raceway and at Langley Speedway. In 2021, Pembelton was the 2021 Virginia State Division I and South East Division I rookie of the year. He also finished 10th in the NASCAR Advance Auto Parts Weekly Series standings.

Pembelton took the victory in the 2021 ValleyStar Credit Union 300, considered to be one of the biggest, most prestigious late-model races. Pembelton beat out drivers such as Sammy Smith, Bubba Pollard, Peyton Sellers, Corey Heim, and Timothy Peters.

ARCA Menards Series 
On January 8, 2022, it was announced that Pembelton would make his ARCA Menards Series debut, running the No. 15 Toyota Camry for Venturini Motorsports at Elko Speedway on a three-race schedule.

Personal life
Pembelton's father, Brian, was a short track driver in Virginia, and was the 2009 Limited Sportsman division champion at South Boston Speedway.

Motorsports career results

ARCA Menards Series

ARCA Menards Series East

ARCA Menards Series West

References

External links 

Living people
2005 births
ARCA Menards Series drivers
NASCAR drivers
Racing drivers from Virginia
People from Amelia, Virginia